Town Hill is the highest point on the island of Bermuda at .

References

Landforms of Bermuda
Bermuda
Smith's Parish
Hills of North America